The  are six Japanese poets of the mid-ninth century who were named by Ki no Tsurayuki in the kana and mana prefaces to the poetry anthology Kokin wakashū (c. 905–14) as notable poets of the generation before its compilers.

History of the term 
In their original appearance in the prefaces of the Kokin wakashū, the six rokkasen are not actually referred to with this term.

There are numerous phrases that show the conceptualization of these six as a cohesive group, but the term "Rokkasen" first appeared in an early Kamakura-period commentary on Kokin wakashū, titled Sanryūshō 三流抄.

Members 
The members of the rokkasen, and their total poems in Kokin wakashū, are as follows:
Ōtomo no Kuronushi, 3 poems
Ono no Komachi, 18 poems
Ariwara no Narihira, 30 poems
Kisen Hōshi, 1 poem
Sōjō Henjō, 17 poems
Fun'ya no Yasuhide, 1 poem

Tsurayuki's Criticism 
In his prefaces to the anthology Kokin wakashū, Ki no Tsurayuki first praises two poets, Kakinomoto no Hitomaro and Yamabe no Akahito, from the period before the rokkasen and then praises these six poets of the generation preceding his own, but also critiques what he considers to be weaknesses in their personal styles.

His criticism in both prefaces is as follows:

Kana preface

Mana preface

There are varying theories on both why Tsurayuki chose these six poets and why he chose to criticize them in this manner. Helen McCullough claims that they were selected because they all had distinctive personal styles in a time of homogeneity, and that by aligning them in his commentary with the six major styles of Han Dynasty poetry, Tsurayuki was showing off his knowledge of those sources. Thomas Lammare also believes that Tsurayuki picked these poets to match the six Han styles, and focuses more on how Tsurayuki claimed these styles did not properly align heart (kokoro 心) and words (kotoba 言葉). On the other hand, Katagiri Yoichi believes that the inclusion of such an obscure figure as Priest Kisen, represented by a single poem, shows that Tsurayuki did not choose the six himself, but received them by some tradition.

Legacy 
The concept of the rokkasen had a lasting legacy on poetic scholarship both in the pre-modern and modern periods.

In 1009–1011, Fujiwara no Kintō compiled an expanded list known as the Thirty-Six Immortals of Poetry, which came to supplant this list of six. This led to the creation of similar lists based on this pattern, such as the "Thirty-Six Court Lady Immortals of Poetry," and the "Thirty-Six Heian-period Immortals of Poetry."

Many Japanese scholars of the twentieth century conceptualized the history of waka poetry in the ninth century as a time when it was overshadowed by Chinese poetry in the first part of the century and then returned to prominence by the end of the century. These narratives held that this time was a transitional period between the waka anthologies Man'yōshū and Kokin wakashū. When discussing the waka poetry of this period, some scholars have referred to it as the Rokkasen Period (六歌仙時代 rokkasen jidai), although there has been disagreement on when this period starts. Most of the scholars agree that it ends with the reign of Emperor Kōkō, but disagree on whether it begins with Emperor Ninmyō or Emperor Montoku. Both Hidehito Nishiyama and Ryōji Shimada conclude that they believe Ninmyō is the better choice for the start of this periodization.

Additionally, all but one of the Rokkasen, Ōtomo Kuronushi, appear in the famous collection of poetry, Hyakunin isshū.

See also 
 Thirty-Six Immortals of Poetry
 Kokin Wakashū

References 

Waka (poetry)
Lists of poets
Japanese literature
Japanese poets
Japanese poetry